is a railway station on the Furano Line in Hokkaido, Japan, operated by the Hokkaido Railway Company (JR Hokkaido).

Lines
Nishinaka Station is served by the Furano Line between Furano and Asahikawa, and the station is numbered "F40". Only all-stations "Local" services stop at this station.

Surrounding Area
  Route 237

See also
 List of railway stations in Japan

References

 JTB Timetable, March 2009 issue

External links
 JR Hokkaido station information 

Railway stations in Hokkaido Prefecture
Railway stations in Japan opened in 1958